The following article is a list of all Queens Park Rangers Football Club managers. This chronological list comprises all those who have held the position of manager of the first team of QPR since they turned professional in 1898. Each manager's entry includes his dates of tenure and the club's overall competitive record (in terms of matches won, drawn and lost), honours won and significant achievements while under his care. Caretaker managers are included, where known, as well as those who have been in permanent charge. As of the start of Mark Warburton's appointment during the beginning of the 2019–20 season, QPR have had 56 full-time managers, with the unusually high figure of 21 management changes in the last 10 years.

Managers
Information correct as of 21 February 2023. Competitive matches counted only. Permanent managers are only on this list.

Notes
A ^ The winning percentage listed is rounded to one decimal place.

References
Specific

General

External links
 QPR's Official Site

Queens Park Rangers
 
Managers